The blusher is the common name for several closely related species of the genus Amanita. A. rubescens or the blushing amanita, is found in Europe and eastern North America, and A. novinupta, also known as the new bride blushing amanita, is found in western North America. Both their scientific and common names are derived from the propensity of their flesh to turn pink on bruising, or cutting.

The mushroom is edible and tasty, sought for in several European countries. It is readily recognizable by its pinkish color on the bottom of the stem. It is avoided by novice mushroomers as without knowledge it can be confused with deadly poisonous species.

Description
The European blusher has a reddish-brown convex pileus (cap), that is 5–15 cm across, and strewn with small white-to-mahogany warts. It is sometimes covered with an ochre-yellow flush which can be washed by the rain. The flesh of the mushroom is white, becoming pink when bruised or exposed to air. This is a key feature in differentiating it from the poisonous false blusher or panther cap (Amanita pantherina), whose flesh does not. The stipe (stem) is white with flushes of the cap colour, and grows to 5–15 cm. The gills are white and free of the stem, and display red spots when damaged.
The ring is striate (i.e. has ridges) on its upper side, another feature distinguishing it from Amanita pantherina.
The spores are white, ovate, amyloid, and approximately 8 by 5 µm in size.

The flavour of the uncooked flesh is mild, but has a faint acrid aftertaste. The smell is not strong.

The mushroom is often attacked by insects.

Distribution and habitat 

It is common throughout much of Europe and eastern North America (in the latter region there are at least three different species that fit into the name Amanita amerirubescens) growing on poor soils as well as in deciduous and coniferous woodlands, appearing from June through to November in the UK. It has also been recorded from South Africa, where it is thought to have been accidentally introduced with trees imported from Europe. It has also been recorded from  Asia 

In eastern North America, Amanita rubescens is frequently parasitized by Hypomyces hyalinus.  Parasitized fruiting bodies are extremely difficult to recognize unless they occur in conjunction with healthy ones, although some retain the "blushing" characteristic of the species.

Amanita novinupta
A species found in the western U.S., only recently formally described and until then frequently misidentified as A. rubescens; see MykoWeb - Fungi of California - Amanita novinupta for details.

Other species
Closely related species include Amanita brunneolocularis,  A. orsonii, A. rubescens var. alba, and A. rubescens var. congolensis.

Uses 
Amanita rubescens is edible when cooked. European A. rubescens is known to contain a hemolytic protein in its raw state, which is destroyed by low pH and when is cooked; it is unknown whether North American A. rubescens and A. novinupta are similarly toxic when eaten raw.

Gallery

See also

List of Amanita species

References

External links

"Tabular and Nontabular Keys to the Rubescent Species of Amanita section Validae" by Rodham E. Tulloss, March 10, 2003.

Amanita rubescens
"Amanita rubescens" by Michael Kuo, MushroomExpert.Com, March 2003.
"Amanita rubescens Pers.:Fr." by Rodham E. Tulloss, June 25, 2006.

Amanita novinupta
"Amanita novinupta" by Michael Kuo, MushroomExpert.Com, March 2003.
"Amanita novinupta Tulloss & J. Lindgr." by Rodham E. Tulloss, July 25, 2006.
"Amanita novinupta" by Michael Wood & Fred Stevens, MykoWeb, 2004. And will

Other species
"Amanita brunneolocularis Tulloss, Ovrebo & Halling" by Rodham E. Tulloss, October 6, 2006.
"Amanita flavorubens (Berk. & Mont.) Sacc." by Rodham E. Tulloss, July 25, 2006.
"Amanita flavorubescens" by Michael Kuo, MushroomExpert.Com, September 2002.
"Amanita orsonii A. Kumar & T. N. Lakh." by Rodham E. Tulloss, July 25, 2006.
"Amanita rubescens var. alba Coker" by Rodham E. Tulloss, July 25, 2006.
"Amanita rubescens var. congolensis Beeli" by Rodham E. Tulloss, July 25, 2006.

Amanita
Fungi of Europe
Fungi of the United States
Ecology of the Appalachian Mountains
Poisonous fungi
Fungi without expected TNC conservation status